Milo Duffek Jr. (* 1928 in
Pocátky, Slovenia + February 25, 2023 in Geneva, Switzerland
was a former Swiss slalom canoeist who competed from the mid 1970s to the early 1980s. He won two medals in the K-1 team event at the ICF Canoe Slalom World Championships with a silver in 1981 and a bronze in 1979.

References

External links 
 Milo jr DUFFEK at CanoeSlalom.net
 http://paddlinglife.com - RIP Milo Duffek: Duffek Stroke'' Inventer Passes Away (Plus Tribute Vid) _ By Eugene Buchanan.

Swiss male canoeists
Living people
Year of birth missing (living people)
Medalists at the ICF Canoe Slalom World Championships